The following are the national records in athletics in the Turks and Caicos Islands maintained by country's national athletics federation: Turks & Caicos Islands Amateur Athletic Association (TCIAAA).

Outdoor

Key to tables:

h = hand timing

A = affected by altitude

Men

Women

Indoor

Men

Women

Notes

References
General
World Athletics Statistic Handbook 2019: National Outdoor Records
World Athletics Statistic Handbook 2018: National Indoor Records
Specific

External links

Turks and Caicos